The hitch (Lavinia exilicauda) is a cyprinid fish endemic to central California, and was once very common. The common name may derive from a Pomoan word for this species. It is the only species in the monospecific genus Lavinia.

Taxonomy
The hitch was first formally described in 1854 by Spencer Fullerton Baird and Charles Frédéric Girard with its type locality given as the Sacramento River in California. While the hitch is closely related to the California roach (Hesperoleucus symmetricus), and the two species can hybridize, leading some authorities to place H. symmetricus in Lavinia, genomic data appear to support the fishes' separate lineages. The Lavinia genus has been placed in the subfamily Leuciscinae of the family Cyprinidae in the 5th edition of Fishes of the World. Other authorities classify the Leuciscidae as a family and place the genus Lavinia in the subfamily Laviniinae of that family.

Three distinct population segments (DPS) or subspecies of the hitch are recognized:
Clear Lake hitch (chi in Pomoan language)
Monterey hitch (Salinas hitch, Pajaro hitch)
Sacramento hitch (Central Valley hitch)
These common names or DPS correspond to the subspecies Lavinia exilicauda chi Hopkirk, 1974, Lavinia exilicauda harengus Girard, 1856 and Lavinia exilicauda exilicauda Baird and Girard in Girard, 1854, respectively.

Description
The hitch shape is deep and laterally compressed, with a small head, and a terminal mouth pointing upwards. They are generally silver all over; younger fish have a black spot at the base of the tail, losing it as they age, and becoming generally darker as well. The anal fin is noticeably longer than for other California minnows, with 11-14 rays, while the dorsal fin has 10-13 rays, and is placed further back, the base being positioned between pelvic and anal fins. The tail fin is large and deeply forked. They can get large for minnows, with lengths of up to 36 cm.  All of these features make them look much like the golden shiner. The hitch is closely related to the California roach (Hesperoleucus symmetricus complex), and these taxa can hybridize with each other.

Hitch are omnivores of the open water, eating a combination of filamentous algae, insects, and zooplankton. They can be found in lakes, sloughs, and slow-moving sections of rivers and streams. With the highest temperature tolerance among the native fish of the Central Valley, they can be found in both warm and cool water; they also have considerable salt tolerance, for instance occurring in Suisun Marsh (7-8 ppt salinity), and Salinas River lagoon (9 ppt).

Distribution
Their range includes the Sacramento River-San Joaquin River System of the Central Valley, the Russian River, Clear Lake, Pajaro River, and Salinas River. Although once abundant, but no longer commercially fished in Clear Lake, populations have been declining. The most likely cause appears to be loss of springtime spawning water flows due to water diversion and damming.

Conservation
The Clear Lake hitch was listed as threatened under the California Endangered Species Act in 2014.

Notes

References

 Peter B. Moyle, Inland Fishes of California (University of California Press, 2002), pp. 136–139

Lavinia (fish)
Endemic fauna of California
Fish of the Western United States
Freshwater fish of North America
Sacramento River
Salinas River (California)
San Joaquin River
Fish described in 1854
Taxa named by Spencer Fullerton Baird